Sar e Aam  is a Pakistani Urdu-language live investigative crime television show, aired on ARY News and hosted by Iqrar ul Hassan Syed.

The show is broadcast at 7 pm to 8 pm Every Friday & Saturday on ARY News and is notable for exposing corrupt figures and unauthentic products/public services like poorly manufactured products, disguising famous company names, among others. The general plot of the program is focused around raising awareness of hidden criminal activities among the public. The program is also known for the seal up and permanent closure of many fake industries, illegal home businesses, and exposure of fraud figures active in communities.

The team consists of informers who are compensated for information disclosed of illegal activities, cameramen, the host himself and other necessary people for the recording of the show.

Episodes

References

External links 
 
  on ARY News

ARY Digital